John McLeod (born 30 September 1947) is a New Zealand cricketer. He played in four first-class matches for Northern Districts from 1970 to 1972.

See also
 List of Northern Districts representative cricketers

References

External links
 

1947 births
Living people
New Zealand cricketers
Northern Districts cricketers
Cricketers from Whanganui